Scatterbrain, released on March 17, 2017, is the second studio album by band KXM, a rock band formed in 2013 featuring King's X bassist and vocalist Doug Pinnick, former Dokken and Lynch Mob guitarist George Lynch and Korn drummer Ray Luzier.

Track listing

Personnel

Doug Pinnick – lead vocals, bass
George Lynch – guitar
Ray Luzier – drums

Additional personnel
Oscar Santiago – percussion

Charts

References

KXM albums
2017 albums